John Giunta  (June 5, 1920 - November 6, 1970) was an illustrator of comic books from the 1940s through the 1960s. He worked on horror titles like Tomb of Terror, Chamber of Chills (Harvey), Journey into Mystery and Weird Tales (Marvel). In 1944, he drew the first comic adaptation of O. Henry's Cisco Kid. In the early 1960s, he became a regular artist on The Fly for Archie Comics. He also worked on titles like Thunder Agents, Air Fighters Comics and Phantom Stranger.

He is most well known for collaborating with Frank Frazetta on Frazetta's first comic book that was published, Snowman from Tally Ho #1 in December 1944.

References

External links

1970 deaths
American comics artists
Year of birth uncertain
American speculative fiction artists
Fantasy artists
Golden Age comics creators
1920 births